Abdoulaye Baldé (born 30 November 1986) is a French professional footballer who currently plays as a striker for Vendée Luçon Football.

Personal life
Born in France, Baldé is of Guinean descent. He is the brother of the footballer Ibrahima Baldé.

References

External links
 lequipe.fr

1986 births
Living people
French sportspeople of Guinean descent
French footballers
Association football forwards
Footballers from Paris
Amiens SC players
FC Metz players
F.C. Lumezzane V.G.Z. A.S.D. players
Hatta Club players
Ligue 1 players
Ligue 2 players
French expatriate footballers
French expatriate sportspeople in Italy
Expatriate footballers in Italy
France youth international footballers
Black French sportspeople